The Department of External Affairs of Principality of Monaco is a governmental agency in Monaco in charge of conducting and designing the foreign policy of the state.

Organization and structure 
The Department of External Relations is responsible for conducting policies related to immunities, diplomatic management and consular affairs, relations with European states and affairs in Europe, international and multilateral affairs and the international environment. The functions of the department are implemented through four main division of the ministry: Department of International Affairs (established on February 16, 2007), the Office of International Cooperation and Development, the Department of Diplomatic and Consular relations, the Diplomatic Posts and Consulates overseas and Monaco's Representations to International Organisations. The Department of External Relations is headed by the Government Counsellor.

The current Government Counsellor for External Relations is Isabelle Berro-Lefèvre.

See also 
 Foreign relations of Monaco
 Government of Monaco

References 

Politics of Monaco
Political organisations based in Monaco
Foreign relations of Monaco
Monaco
Government of Monaco